Bardak Siah Palace is the name of the site of an ancient Achaemenid Persian palace situated in the ancient city of Temukan near the township of Borazjan in the northern part of Bushehr Province of Iran. The site was unearthed in 1977 by Iranian archeologists headed by Ehsan Yaghmai

Further excavations at the site in 2005 led to a fragmentary sculpture featuring the head of the Achaemenid emperor Darius the Great (r. 521 BC-485 BC) with a servant carrying an umbrella behind him as well as four pieces of gold in the form of thick folded sheets with a combined weight of about three kilograms buried beside one of the main hall’s columns. Yaghmaii said he believed the gold sheets may have inscriptions on them and may have been deliberately folded and hidden during antiquity. An inscription was also recovered with handwriting in the Neo-Babylonian language.

References

Sources
Archaeology news about Bardak Siah of Iran

Archaeological sites in Iran
Archaeology of the Achaemenid Empire
Buildings and structures in Bushehr Province
1977 in Iran
1977 archaeological discoveries
Archaeological discoveries in Iran